Louis Née was a French cinematographer. He worked on Maurice Tourneur's 1938 film The Patriot.

Selected filmography
 The Darling of Paris (1931)
 On the Streets (1933)
 Temptation (1934)
 The Last Billionaire (1934)
 Antonia (1935)
 Les yeux noirs (1935)
 The Brighton Twins (1936)
 The Citadel of Silence (1937)
 The Patriot (1938)
 Miquette (1950)
 Three Days to Live (1957)

References

Bibliography
 Waldman, Harry. Maurice Tourneur: The Life and Films. McFarland, 2001.

External links

Year of birth unknown
Year of death unknown
French cinematographers